Natani ( nâtani) is a 2004 Persian-language romance novel by Iranian American writer and scholar Mehdi Khalaji about the life of the son of an Ayatollah growing up in present-day Qom, Iran. It was published in Berlin by Gardoon, an Iranian publishing company, and it is the first Persian novel set in Qom and its seminary.

The novel alternates between the present and the past, a reflection of the protagonist's life as he converses with a complete stranger.

The title Natani is a play on words.  The Persian word natani means “half-blooded” (as in one's half-brother or half-sister, for example) on the one hand, but the title can also be deciphered as na-tani, meaning no-body (negation of the body), or dismemberment.  This interpretation of the title embodies the novel's general ambiance, as many times its narrative envelops not merely the struggles of the main character, but the struggles and frustration of a dark, oppressive spirituality that suppresses recognition of the body, while simultaneously being obsessed by it.

Synopsis

Natani alternates between the present and the past, a reflection of the protagonist's life as he converses with a stranger. A love story between the protagonist, Fouad, and his first love, Zahra, it is romantic with hints of comedy and dramatic undertones simultaneously. The novel spans one night in a hotel lobby in Paris, France, and it is interlaced with flashbacks from Fouad's adolescence in Qom, Iran.  A native of Iran, Fouad lives in London and is in Paris to meet his girlfriend.  Prior to her arrival, he becomes transfixed by an elegant woman who enters the hotel lobby. Her appearance reminds him of Zahra, and what it felt like to fall in love. Fouad's girlfriend arrives, and they have dinner, and later, Fouad finds himself restless and unable to sleep.  He returns to the lobby only to find the woman he saw earlier.  He begins talking to her about his life growing up as the son of an ayatollah in the restrictive religious society of Iran. The narrative continues to alternate between their conversation and his flashbacks until the following morning. Fouad offers that one's hometown is not where one lives, but where one "gives birth".  This is how Paris and Qom, in Fouad's mind, stand isolated on two opposite sides of the world.

Themes and style

The narration allows the reader to follow Fouad and experience the petrifying presence of religion-based power and oppression in its domination of daily life. Fouad's upbringing lacked the presence of women, the result of strict Islamic law in which women have little freedom and are hidden from society. Repression is not unique to women; there is general suppression of the human body and its understanding. As a result, Fouad lives in a masculine, chauvinist environment, and experiences numerous acts of oppression instituted by the political system including the public stoning of women, female genital mutilation (which he sees in a dream), and terrifying scenes taking place in court and in prison. However, the narration maintains a cool, almost humorous perspective as these thoughts and memories flow through Fouad's head, making the novel more of an impersonal account than tragic.

The absence of chapters gives the novel the feeling of an extremely long sentence.  Instead of outright dialogue, there is subtle, poetic prose. The narrator's voice transforms into an impersonal one sfrom the depth of a historical period that critiques an entire society.

References

2004 novels
Persian-language novels
Iranian romance novels
Persian words and phrases
Novels set in Iran